The 5th Annual M.A.M.A. Awards was held on January 29, 2016, at Žalgiris Arena in Kaunas, Lithuania.

Nominees and winners 
Note: Winners are listed in bold.

Best Female Act 
 Alina Orlova
 Girmantė
 Jurga Šeduikytė
 Monika Linkytė
 Monika Liu

Best Male Act 
 Edgaras Lubys
 Jurgis Didžiulis
 Markas Palubenka
 Tomas Sinickis
 Vaidas Baumila

Breakthrough of the Year 
 Antikvariniai Kašpirovskio Dantys
 Deeper Upper
 Garbanotas Bosistas
 Monika Liu
 Z On A

Best Pop Act 
 Jurga Šeduikytė
 Leon Somov & Jazzu
 Monika Linkytė
 SEL
 Vaidas Baumila

Best Rock Act 
 BIX
 Rebelheart
 Siela
 Tomas Sinickis
 Freaks On Floor

Best Alternative Act 
 Aistė Smilgevičiūtė & SKYLĖ
 Alina Orlova
 ba.
 Garbanotas Bosistas
 Vidas Bareikis

Best Electronic Act 
 Beissoul & Einius
 Deep Shoq
 GeraiGerai
 Jazzyvile
 Proper Heat

Best Hip Hop Act 
 Dee & Kamy
 G&G Sindikatas
 Lilas & Innomine
 MC Mesijus & Münpauzn
 Omerta

Best Band 
 Aistė Smilgevičiūtė & SKYLĖ
 BIX
 Garbanotas Bosistas
 Leon Somov & Jazzu
 SEL

Best Live Act 
 Antis
 Džordana Butkutė
 Gytis Paškevičius
 Marijonas Mikutavičius
 SEL

Best Album 
 Tomas Sinickis – Mylimas Vyras Ir Sūnus
 MC Mesijus & Münpauzn – #UZGROTU
 Garbanotas Bosistas – Above Us
 Leon Somov & Jazzu – Istorijos
 Freaks On Floor – Life
 Markas Palubenka – Puzzleman
 BIX – RAY
 G&G Sindikatas – Revoliucijos Garso Takelis
 Aistė Smilgevičiūtė & SKYLĖ – Vilko Vartai
 Monika Linkytė – Walk With Me

Best Song 
 Lilas & Innomine – „Karina“
 Monika Linkytė – „Po dangum“
 Leon Somov & Jazzu – „Po mano oda“
 Monika Linkytė & Vaidas Baumila – „This Time“
 Marijonas Mikutavičius – „Tu čia, tu čia“

Best Music Video 
 Markas Palubenka – „A Woman Of Stone“
 Vaidas Baumila – „Ant Mašinos Stogo“
 Antikvariniai Kašpirovskio Dantys – „Į Venesuelą“
 The Roop – „Not Too Late“
 Deeper Upper – „Unity“

AGATA Most-Played Act 
 Aistė Smilgevičiūtė & SKYLĖ

LATGA Most Popular Composer 
 Leon Somov

Award of Merit 
 Nerija

External links 
 Official website

2016 music awards